Major-General Cecil Martin Fothergill ('Peter') Deakin  (December 1910 – 8 September 1992) was a British Army officer.

Military career
Deakin was commissioned into the Grenadier Guards on 29 January 1931. After serving the Second World War he became commander of 32nd Guards Brigade in July 1953, commander of 29th Infantry Brigade in January 1955 and Director of Military Training  at the War Office in January 1959. We went on to be General Officer Commanding 56th (London) Infantry Division in March 1959 and then Director-General of the Territorial Army in August 1960 before retiring in September 1962.

He was known as "Peter".

Family
In 1934 he married Evelyn Mary Frances Grant, daughter of Colonel Sir Arthur Grant of Monymusk, 10th Baronet; they had a son and a daughter.

References

1910 births
1992 deaths
British Army major generals
Companions of the Order of the Bath
Commanders of the Order of the British Empire
Grenadier Guards officers
British Army personnel of World War II